Aspidosaurus is an extinct genus of dissorophoid temnospondyl within the family Dissorophidae.

Description
Like other dissorophids, Aspidosaurus species had a single row of plates formed by expansions of the neural spines.

Taxonomy
In 1911, Paul Miller discovered the remains of various dissorophid bones in New Mexico that were attributed to a new species, Aspidosaurus novomexicanus. The skull closely resembled that of a specimen of Cacops aspidephorus found in Texas but the arrangement of ridges in the otic region was different. The teeth found were slender and conical and all of an approximately equal size. The vertebral column, pelvis and limb bones were also similar but the new specimen was distinguished from Cacops by the armour, the single row of vertical plates that were originally attached to the neural spines of the vertebrae. A. novomexicanus was later attributed to the genus Broiliellus. More recently, "A." novomexicanus has been removed from Broiliellus and classified as a closer relative of Cacops. The original specimen is now housed in the University of California Museum of Paleontology and is referred to as the "Rio Arriba taxon" because of its uncertain phylogenetic placement.

The genus Alegeinosaurus Case, 1911 was synonymized with Aspidosaurus by Gee (2018) based on a redescription of the holotype.

Phylogeny
Below is a cladogram from Schoch (2012) in which valid Aspidosaurus species are found to be basal dissorophids and "Aspidosaurus" novomexicanus -the Rio Arriba taxon- nests within the subfamily Cacopinae:

References

Dissorophids
Carboniferous amphibians of North America
Cisuralian amphibians of North America
Pennsylvanian first appearances
Cisuralian genus extinctions
Prehistoric amphibian genera